Adzitarovo (Atyetär) is a rural locality (a selo) and the administrative centre of Adzitarovsky Selsoviet, Karmaskalinsky District, Bashkortostan, Russia. The population was 499 as of 2010. There are 5 streets.

Geography 
Adzitarovo is located 38 km west of Karmaskaly (the district's administrative centre) by road. Yelizavetino is the nearest rural locality.

References 

Rural localities in Karmaskalinsky District